Gangshanoceras is a fossil nautiloid cephalopod genus included in the orthocerid family Proteoceratidae.  It has been found in Ordovician rocks dated from about 478.5 to 468 Ma in China, and from rocks dated slightly younger, about 468 to 461 Ma in Argentina.  It has five described species.  The type is Gangshanoceras jurongense.

References

Orthoceratoidea
Ordovician cephalopods
Fossils of China
Fossil taxa described in 1988